The Center for Tobacco Products (CTP) was established by the United States Food and Drug Administration as a result of the Family Smoking Prevention and Tobacco Control Act signed by President Obama in June 2009.
The FDA center was responsible for the implementation of the Family Smoking Prevention and Tobacco Control Act.

The smoking prevention and tobacco law established regulatory controls for tobacco products:

 Setting performance standards for tobacco products
 Reviewing premarket applications for new and modified risk of tobacco product
 Requirement of warning labels for tobacco products
 Enforcing advertising and promotion restrictions for tobacco products

The U.S. mandated legislation was a historic milestone for the U.S. FDA. The enacted law used to assist with the federal agency regulatory efforts and initiatives to curb the suspected health hazards for tobacco products on an annual basis.

References

External links

 
 Tobacco Products at FDA.gov

Food and Drug Administration
Tobacco control